The expression "everything bubble" refers to the correlated impact of monetary easing by the Federal Reserve (and followed by the European Central Bank and the Bank of Japan) on asset prices in most asset classes, namely equities, housing, bonds, many commodities, and even exotic assets such as cryptocurrencies and SPACs.  The term is related to the Fed put, being the tools of direct and indirect quantitative easing that the Fed used to execute the monetary easing, and to modern monetary theory, which advocates the use of such tools, even in non-crisis periods, to create economic growth through asset price inflation.  The term first came in use during the chair of Janet Yellen, but it is most associated with the subsequent chair of Jerome Powell, and the 2020–2021 period of the coronavirus pandemic.

The everything bubble was not only notable for the simultaneous extremes in valuations recorded in a wide range of asset classes and the high level of speculation in the market, but that its peak in 2021 occurred in a period of recession, high unemployment, trade wars, and political turmoil – leading to a realization that the bubble was a central bank creation, with concerns on the independence and integrity of market pricing, and on the Fed's impact on wealth inequality.

In 2022, financial historian Edward Chancellor said "central banks' unsustainable policies have created an 'everything bubble', leaving the global economy with an inflation 'hangover. Rising inflation did ultimately force the Fed to tighten financial conditions during 2022 (i.e. raising interest rates and employing quantitative tightening), and by June 2022 the Wall Street Journal wrote that the Fed had "pricked the Everything Bubble". In the same month, financial journalist Rana Foroohar told the New York Times, "Welcome to the End of the 'Everything Bubble.

History

Origin
The term first appeared in 2014, during the chair of Janet Yellen, and reflected her strategy of applying prolonged monetary looseness (e.g. the Yellen put of continual low-interest rates and direct quantitative easing), as a method of boosting near-term economic growth via asset price inflation (a part of modern monetary theory (MMT)).

The term came to greater prominence during the subsequent chair of Jerome Powell, initially during Powell's first monetary easing in Q4 2019 (the Powell put), but more substantially during the 2020–2021 coronavirus pandemic, when Powell embraced asset bubbles to combat the financial impact of the pandemic. By early 2021, Powell had created the loosest financial conditions ever recorded, and most US assets were simultaneously at levels of valuation that matched their highest individual levels in economic history. Powell rejected the claim that US assets were definitively in a bubble, invoking the Fed model, to assert that ultra-low yields justified higher asset prices. Powell also rejected criticism that the scale of the asset bubbles had widened US wealth inequality to levels not seen since the 1920s,  on the basis that the asset bubbles would themselves promote job growth, thus reducing the inequality. The contrast between the distress experienced by "Main Street" during the pandemic, and the economic boom experienced by "Wall Street", who had one of their most profitable years in history, was controversial, and earned Powell the title of Wall Street's Dr. Feelgood.

Powell was supported by Congress, with speaker Pelosi saying in October 2020, "Well, let me just say that the number, I think, that is staggering is that we have more people unemployed and on unemployment benefits than any time in our country's history.  We know that the Fed is shoring up the markets so that the stock market can do well. I don't complain about that, I want the market to do well."

Peak in 2021

In early 2021, some market participants warned that Powell's everything bubble had reached dangerous levels. Investor Jeremy Grantham said, "All three of Powell's predecessors claimed that the asset prices they helped inflate in turn aided the economy through the wealth effect", before eventually collapsing. Investor Seth Klarman said that the Fed had "broken the market", and that "the market's usual role in price discovery had been suspended". Economist Mohamed El-Erian said "you have such an enormous disconnect between fundamentals and valuations", and that the record highs in assets were due to the actions of the Fed and the ECB, clarifying "That is the reason why we've seen prices going from one record high to another despite completely changing narratives. Forget about the 'great reopening', the 'Trump trade' and all this other stuff".  The Financial Times warned that the inequality from Powell's K-shaped recovery could lead to political and social instability, saying: "The majority of people are suffering, amid a Great Gatsby-style boom at the top".

Several commentators called the 2020–2021 market created by Powell as being the most speculative market ever seen, including CNBC host Jim Cramer who said: "You can't lose in that market", and "it's like a slot machine" that always pays out. "I've not seen this in my career". Bloomberg said: "Animal spirits are famously running wild across Wall Street, but crunch the numbers and this bull market is even crazier than it seems" ("Animal spirits" is a term popularized in the 1930s by economist John Maynard Keynes to describe the influence of human emotions on finance and investing). The extreme level of speculation led to notable individual speculative events including the GameStop short squeeze in January 2021, the five-fold rise in the Goldman Sachs Non-Profitable Technology Index. and the record rise in micro-cap stocks, 14 of which would have qualified for inclusion in the S&P 500 Index by February 2021. At the end of January 2021, the Wall Street Journal markets desk said: "For once, everyone seems to agree: Much of the market looks like it's in a bubble", while Goldman Sachs said that the S&P 500 was at or near its most expensive levels in history on most measures, with the forward EV/EBITDA breaking 17× for the first time.

In February 2021, the Fed's Bullard said that they did not see an asset bubble and would continue to apply a high level of monetary stimulus. Bloomberg wrote that Powell, in the final year of his first term, was afraid to tighten in case of a repeat of the crash he caused in Q4 2018. The Financial Times warned US regulators to regard the experience of the Chinese stock market bubble, when monetary easing by the Chinese state in 2014 led to a bubble, but then a crash over 2015–2016, in Chinese markets. In February 2021, the former head of the BOJ financial markets division warned that the BOJ should adjust the level of direct purchases it makes of Nikkei ETFs due to bubble concerns.

Popping of bubble in 2022

By early 2022, rising inflation forced Powell, and latterly other central banks, to significantly tighten financial conditions including raising interest rates and quantitative tightening (the opposite of quantitative easing), which led to a synchronized fall across most asset prices (i.e. the opposite effect to the 'everything bubble'). In May 2022, financial historian Edward Chancellor told Fortune that "central banks' unsustainable policies have created an 'everything bubble', leaving the global economy with an inflation 'hangover. Chancellor separately noted to Reuters, "If ultralow interest rates were responsible for inflating an 'everything bubble', it follows that everything – well, almost everything – is at risk from rising rates". By June 2022, James Mackintosh of The Wall Street Journal wrote that the Fed had "pricked the Everything Bubble", while in the same month the financial journalist Rana Foroohar told the New York Times, "Welcome to the End of the 'Everything Bubble.

Records set in the US

The post-2020 period of the everything bubble produced several simultaneous US records/near-records for extreme levels in a diverse range of asset valuation and financial speculation metrics:

General 
In December 2020, the Goldman Sachs GFCI Global Financial Conditions Index (a measure of US monetary looseness), dropped below 98 for the first time in its history (the GFCI goes back to 1987).
 In January 2021, the Citibank Panic/Euphoria Index hit broke 2.0 for the first time since its inception in 1988, surpassing the previous dot-com peak of 1.5.
In February 2021, the ratio of margin debt-to-cash in Wall Street trading accounts hit 172%, just below the historical peak of 179% set in March 2000.
In February 2021, the Congressional Budget Office estimated that US Federal Public Debt held by the public would hit 102% of US GDP, just below the historic all-time high of 105% in 1946.

Bonds 
In January 2021, the Sherman Ratio (the yield per unit of bond duration), known as the "Bond Market's Scariest Gauge", hit an all-time low of 0.1968 for the US Corporate Bond Index.
In February 2021, the yield on the US junk bond index dropped below 4% for the first time in history (the historical default rate going back to the 1980s is 4–5% per annum).

Equities 

In January 2021, Goldman Sachs recorded that the forward EV/EBITDA of the S&P 500 had passed 17× on an aggregate basis, and 15.5× for the median stock, for the first time in history (note that the price-earnings ratio was less comparable due to the 2018 reduction in the US corporate tax from 39% to 21%).
By January 2021, the short-interest on the S&P 500 dropped to 1.6%, matching the record low of 2000; the "most-shorted US stocks" outperformed by the largest margin in history in 2020.
In January 2021, the ratio of US corporate insider share sales-to-purchases ratio hit an all-time high of 7.8× (i.e. 7.8 times more corporate executives sold their company's stock than purchased it).
In February 2021, the Buffett indicator, being the ratio of the total value of the US stock market (as defined by the Wilshire 5000) to US GDP, set an all-time high above 200%, surpassing the previous dot.com peak of 159.2% (and the 2009 low of 66.7%).  In 2001, Buffett said: "If the ratio approaches 200%—as it did in 1999 and a part of 2000—you are playing with fire".
In February 2021, the Price-to-Sales ratio of US stocks hit an all-time high of 2.95×, surpassing its dot.com peak of 2.45× (and the 2009 low of 0.8×).
In February 2021, the price-to-tangible book ratio of US stocks hit an all-time high of 14×, surpassing its dot-com peak of 9× (and the 2009 low of 3×).
In February 2021, the US equity put/call ratio, hit 0.40×, almost matching the March 2000 low of 0.39× (a low ratio means investors are very bullish).
In February 2021, the combined capitalization of the top 5 stocks in the S&P 500 (being Apple, Microsoft, Amazon, Tesla, and Facebook) was 21% of the index, surpassing the prior March 2000 peak of 18% (being Microsoft, Cisco, General Electric, Intel, and Exxon).
In February 2021, a record 14 members of the Russell Microcap Index, and a record 302 members of the Russell 2000 Index were larger than the smallest member of the S&P 500 Index.

Housing 

 In November 2020, the Robert J. Shiller cyclically adjusted price-to-earnings ratio for US housing, hit 43.9×, just 3.8% below its all-time record of 45.6× set in 2006.

Cryptocurrencies 

 In January 2021, the total value of cryptocurrencies passed US$1 trillion for the first time in history, with most currencies setting new highs in value.
 In February 2021, bitcoin passed US$50,000 per unit for the first time in history.

Special-purpose acquisition vehicles 

In 2020, a record 248 special-purpose acquisition company (SPACs) raised US$83 billion in new capital at their initial public offering; and by Q1 2021, a further record US$30 billion was raised in a single quarter. SPACs are notoriously poor-performing assets, whose returns 3-years after merging are almost uniformly heavily negative; their proliferation is a signal of an economic bubble.

Commodities 

In July 2020, gold futures broke the US$2,000 per ounce level for the first time in history.
In August 2020, lumber prices, as defined by the CME one-month futures contract, broke the old historic record high of US$651 per thousand board feet, to reach US$1711 in May 2021.

Notable US cases

As well as the above asset-level records, a number of individual assets with extreme valuations and extraordinary price increases were identified as being emblematic of the everything bubble:
Ark Innovation ETF (Ticker:ARKK), American exchange traded fund, and major investor in Tesla and other technology firms.
Goldman Sachs Non-Profitable US Technology Index, a proprietary index of US technology firms that were loss-making.
Russell Microcap Index stocks, the smallest listed US stocks where a record number grew in a short period past the size of the smallest S&P 500 stock.
S&P Clean Energy Index, proprietary index of (mostly) US clean energy firms whose P/E ratio tripled.
Tesla Inc. (Ticker:TSLA), the American electric car manufacturer.

See also
Criticism of the Federal Reserve
K-shaped recovery
Fed model
Greenspan put
Stock market bubble

Notes

References

Further reading

External links

The Everything Bubble, (Graydon Carter, Vanity Fair, October 2015)
Here's the potential upside when the 'Everything Bubble' finally pops (MarketWatch, August 2019)
Implications of the Everything Bubble, Bloomberg TV: Interview with Scott Minerd (Guggenheim Partners, February 2020)
Tesla: The 'Everything Bubble' Embodied Vikram Mansharamani (Harvard University, September 2020)
The 'everything bubble' is back in business (Australian Financial Review, December 2020)
Georgia and the everything market bubble (Desmond Lachman, The Hill, January 2021)

Monetary policy
Monetary policy of the United States
Economic bubbles
2010s neologisms
Economic history of the United States
Economic impact of the COVID-19 pandemic
History of the Federal Reserve System
Monetary economics
Central banks
Criticisms of economics
Systemic risk
Post-Keynesian economics
2020s economic history
2010s economic history
Commodity booms